The somewhat involved history of the ownership and management of the Royal Opera House, Covent Garden can be split up into four main categories: the successive physical theatre buildings; the managers of the various theatrical and operatic companies which played there (historically, a mixture of actor-managers and impresarios); the leaseholders of the opera houses built on the land; and the owners of the freehold (i.e. ground landlords). From the early 20th century the theatre's management tended to be split between a general administrator and a musical/artistic director.

The horizontal alignment of dates in the table is only approximate.

See also
Managerial and musical heads of The Royal Opera, 1946 to date

References
Notes

Sources
  (Edited from Pitt's unpublished MS autobiography) 

 
 
 
 
 
  (Paragraphs are numbered in faint (¶) on the lh side.)
 
  Volume 1 • Volume 2

Royal Opera House
Covent Garden